Hak-dong Station is a rapid transit station on Seoul Subway Line 7. It is located in Nonhyeon-dong in the Gangnam-gu administrative district of Seoul. The area around the station was known as Hak-dong prior to 1982 and Hakdong intersection sits at the west end of the station. Nine buses service the station through 10 exits. The station services Nonhyeon 1-dong and Nonhyeon 2-dong. This station cannot be crossed in the opposite direction because the turnstiles are divided by direction.

Station layout

Average daily passenger numbers

References

Metro stations in Gangnam District
Seoul Metropolitan Subway stations
Railway stations opened in 2000